Ostler is a surname, and may refer to:

People
Andreas Ostler (1921–1988), German Olympic bobsledder
Blake Ostler (born 1955), American attorney
Dominic Ostler (born 1970), English cricketer
Nicholas Ostler (born 1952), British linguist
William Ostler (died 1614), English actor
Rob Ostlere, English actor
Gordon Ostlere (1921–2017), English surgeon and anaesthetist

Other uses 
 Hostler or ostler, a stableman